The Battle of Cârlibaba was a battle of the Eastern Front of the World War I, fought between 18 and 22 January 1915. It took place near the village of Cârlibaba, Romania near the Bistrița river. It was fought between the Russian Empire, and the Austria-Hungary. The battle ended with the victory of Austria-Hungarian forces. The Russian forces were commanded by Lucjan Żeligowski, while Austria-Hungarian, by Karl von Pflanzer-Baltin, Emil Schultheiss, Zygmunt Zieliński, Marian Januszajtis-Żegota.

References 

Carlibaba
Carlibaba
Carlibaba
Carlibaba
Carlibaba
January 1915 events
1915 in Romania